Asim Khan (born 14 February 1962) is a former Dutch cricket player. He played 51 times for The Netherlands between 1994 and 2002, including two ICC Trophy tournaments in 1997 and 2001. In the first of those two tournaments he took 7/9 against East & Central Africa, which remains the best bowling figures by a Dutch player in the ICC Trophy.

He is now the assistant coach of the national Under 19 Cricket team of the Netherlands, who will be participating in the ICC Europe Division 2 Qualification round for the World Cup in 2020.

References

1962 births
Living people
Dutch cricketers
Pakistani emigrants to the Netherlands
Cricketers from Lahore
Pakistani cricketers